Reading Research Quarterly is a quarterly peer-reviewed academic journal published by Wiley-Blackwell. The current editors are Robert T. Jiménez (Peabody College, Vanderbilt University) and Amanda P. Goodwin (Peabody College, Vanderbilt University). The journal is one of three journals published on behalf of the International Literacy Association.

According to the Journal Citation Reports, the journal has a 2011 impact factor of 2.697, ranking it 5th out of 203 journals in the category "Education & Educational Research" and 5th out of 51 journals in the category "Psychology, Educational".

References

External links 
 

Wiley-Blackwell academic journals
Education journals
Quarterly journals
Publications established in 1966
English-language journals